The Casa Gasull is a building  in Reus, Catalonia, Spain, designed by Modernista architect Lluís Domènech i Montaner.

The Casa Gasull was designed in 1910 and was finished in 1912. The building is close to Casa Rull, another Catalan Modernista building, also designed by Domènech i Montaner.

See also
Lluís Domènech i Muntaner
Reus
Modernisme

Modernisme architecture in Reus
Buildings and structures in Reus
Buildings and structures completed in 1912
Lluís Domènech i Montaner buildings
1912 establishments in Spain